Robert "Bob" T. McGrath is the director of RASEI, a joint institute of NREL and CU-Boulder. He was a senior vice president responsible for research partnership development in the office of the Executive Vice President for Research. He is also a former director of the Georgia Tech Research Institute, the applied research arm of Georgia Tech, a position he held from 2011 to 2014. Prior to his appointment as GTRI director, McGrath was involved with the Battelle Memorial Institute; his past experience also includes research leadership positions at the National Renewable Energy Lab, Ohio State University, and Penn State University.

Education
McGrath holds four degrees; three are from Pennsylvania State University, including a 1972 B.S. (Honors) in engineering sciences, a 1974 M.S. in physics, and a 1975 M.A. in mathematics. He also holds a 1980 Ph.D. from the University of Michigan in nuclear science and engineering.

Research scientist
From 1975 to 1976, McGrath was a Systems Engineer for HRB Singer, which is now a division of Raytheon. He worked on integrating situation awareness and command and control technology onto the USS John F. Kennedy (CV-67). From 1978 to 1983, he was a consultant, visiting researcher and graduate student intern at Pacific Northwest National Laboratory, Exxon Research and TRW.

From 1980 to 1984, McGrath was a visiting summer research scientist, specializing in fusion power, at Argonne National Laboratory. From July 1984 to February 1998, McGrath was a division manager, research and development program manager, and research scientist at Sandia National Laboratories.

Educator
From August 1980 to June 1984, McGrath was an Assistant Professor of Engineering at Pennsylvania State University. From November 1996 to June 2004, he was a Professor of Engineering Science. Since July 2004, McGrath has been an Adjunct Professor of Engineering Science.

Administrator

From September 1998 to June 2004, McGrath was the Associate Vice President for Research, Director of Strategic & Interdisciplinary Initiatives, and Director of the Marine Corps Research University at Penn State University. From July 2004 to July 2008 he was the Senior Vice President for Research at The Ohio State University. From February 2008 to March 2010, McGrath was the Deputy Laboratory Director for Science & Technology at the National Renewable Energy Laboratory (NREL) in Golden, Colorado. From April 2010 to January 2011, McGrath was on the leadership team of Battelle Memorial Institute.

From February 2011 to October 2014, McGrath was the director of the Georgia Tech Research Institute and a vice president of the Georgia Institute of Technology. In October 2014, he accepted a position as senior vice president in the Office of the Executive Vice President for Research at Georgia Tech. In this role, he is responsible for developing major research partnerships for Georgia Tech, in particular with the United States Department of Energy national laboratories.

References

Georgia Tech Research Institute people
Georgia Tech faculty
Living people
Smeal College of Business alumni
University of Michigan College of Engineering alumni
Sandia National Laboratories people
Year of birth missing (living people)
Penn State College of Engineering alumni